Plumergat is a commune in the Morbihan department of Brittany in north-western France. Inhabitants of Plumergat are called in French Plumergatais.

Geography

Plumergat is border by Sainte-Anne-d'Auray and Pluneret to the south. The village of Meriadec, which has 700 inhabitants, is divided in two between Pluneret and Plumergat.

Map

Breton language
In 2011, 6.6% of the children attended the bilingual schools in primary education.

See also
Communes of the Morbihan department

References

External links

 Mayors of Morbihan Association 

Communes of Morbihan